The 2011–12 Liga II was the 72nd season of the Liga II, the second tier of the Romanian football league system. The league structure had two series of 16 teams each. The first two teams in each series were promoted and the last three in each series were relegated. The season began on August 20.

Teams
Three of the five relegated teams from the previous Liga I season, Timișoara, Gloria Bistrița and Unirea Urziceni, did not apply for a Liga II license. The latter club was dissolved, while the first two appealed the relegation decision at the Court of Arbitration for Sport and did not to apply for Liga II licenses. Previously they were denied Liga I licenses for the 2011–12 season and were relegated, despite finishing on non-relegating spots. Their cases were dismissed by the CAS on July 18. (See 2011–12 Liga I licensing controversies.) On July 8, the Executive Committee of the FRF decided to accept Timișoara and Gloria Bistrița in this season of Liga II despite not requesting a license, arguing the decision as taken in consideration for their respective cities and supporters. Also relegated from the first division, Universitatea Craiova was temporary excluded by FRF from all internal competitions. Juventus București were spared from relegation instead. Additionally, Timișoara would not have the right to promote, falling the three-year rule of the Financial Fair Play Regulations.

Seria I

Seria II

League tables

Seria I

Seria II

Goals 
12 goals
  Daniel Florea (Delta Tulcea)

6 goals
  Cristian Silvășan (Gloria Bistrița)

5 goals
  Bogdan Mara (UTA Arad)

4 goals
  Daniel Stan (Gloria Bistrița)

See also

 2011–12 Liga I
 2011–12 Liga III

References

2011-12
Rom
2